Ed Kemp was an American baseball outfielder in the Negro leagues. He played with the Philadelphia Royal Stars in 1922, Baltimore Black Sox in 1923 and the Lincoln Giants in 1924.

References

External links
 and Baseball-Reference Black Baseball stats and Seamheads

Baltimore Black Sox players
Lincoln Giants players
Year of birth missing
Year of death missing
Baseball outfielders